"Toe Jam" is the debut single by British electronic act the Brighton Port Authority, released on 5 August 2008 from their debut album I Think We're Gonna Need a Bigger Boat. The song was composed by and features musician David Byrne and rapper Dizzee Rascal. The song was listed at number 14 on Rolling Stone magazine's list of the 100 best songs of 2008.

The music video for the song, directed by Keith Schofield, predominantly features naked dancing men and women. The censor bars placed over their genital areas and the females' breasts form figures on the screen. The music video received much attention on the Internet. The song was also performed live on Saturday Night Live when Byrne was a musical guest.

Charts

References

2008 debut singles
2008 songs
David Byrne songs
Dizzee Rascal songs
Songs written by David Byrne
Songs written by Dizzee Rascal